Manchester is a city in Northwest England.  The M60 postcode area of the city is termed a non-geographic postcode area - that is, it does not correspond with a specific area. Buildings given an M60 postcode were historically very large receivers of mail, and were usually located in the City Centre (postcode areas M1,2,3 or 4), although Great Universal Stores (located in M12) also used an M60 code. The postcode was created for internal Royal Mail reasons - It allowed for large amounts of mail to by-pass the sorting processes within the city centre quickly and efficiently. The postcode contains 13 listed buildings that are recorded in the National Heritage List for England.  Of these, one is listed at Grade I, the highest of the three grades, one is at Grade II*, the middle grade, and the others are at Grade II, the lowest grade.  The area to the northwest contains HM Prison Manchester, and four structures associated with it are listed.  The other listed buildings include two structures associated with Liverpool Road railway station, office buildings, a hotel, a departmental store, and a pair of bollards.


Key

Buildings

References

Citations

Sources

Lists of listed buildings in Greater Manchester
Buildings and structures in Manchester